David and Lisa is a 1962 American drama film directed by Frank Perry.  It is based on the second story in the two-in-one novellas Jordi/Lisa and David by Theodore Isaac Rubin; the screenplay, written by Frank Perry's wife Eleanor Perry (née Rosenfeld), tells the story of a bright young man suffering from a mental illness which, among other symptoms, has instilled in him a fear of being touched. This lands him in a residential treatment center, where he meets Lisa, a similarly ill young woman who displays a split personality.

The film earned Perry a nomination for the 1963 Academy Award for Best Director and one for Eleanor Perry for her screenplay.

The film was later adapted into a stage play in 1967 and a made-for-television film in 1998.

Plot
David Clemens is brought to a residential psychiatric treatment center by his apparently caring mother.  He becomes very upset when one of the residents brushes his hand, as he believes that being touched can kill him. Cold and distant, he mainly concentrates on his studies, especially that of clocks, with which he appears to be obsessed. It is later revealed that he has a recurring dream in which he murders people by means of a giant clock.

He meets Lisa Brandt, a girl who has two personalities: one of them, Lisa, can only speak in rhymes, while the other, Muriel, cannot speak, but can only write. David befriends her by talking to her in rhymes. Over time, he begins to open up to his psychiatrist, Dr. Alan Swinford, and also becomes friendly with another resident, Simon, which provokes Lisa's jealousy. Following an argument when his mother visits, David's parents decide that he should leave the place. He returns to his parents' house, but after a short time, runs away to the treatment center, where he is allowed to stay.

One day Lisa realizes that she is both Lisa and Muriel and that they are the same person. After this breakthrough, she seeks out David, but he is busy listening to Simon play a Bach piece on the piano.  Lisa turns on the metronome, interrupting Simon's playing and provoking David's anger. Then, Lisa runs away from the center and takes the train into Center City, Philadelphia, unnoticed. David and the staff fruitlessly search for her until the next morning, when David realizes that she might have returned to the Philadelphia Museum of Art, where she had once embraced a statue of a mother and child.

David and Dr. Swinford rush to the museum, where David finds Lisa on the museum steps. Upon seeing David, Lisa appears to be cured and speaks to him in prose. David, overcoming his own fear of touch for the first time, allows her to hold his hand, while they walk down the stairs to go on their return trip.

Cast 

 Keir Dullea as David Clemens
 Janet Margolin as Lisa Brandt
 Howard Da Silva as Dr. Alan Swinford
 Neva Patterson as Mrs. Clemens
 Richard McMurray as Stewart Clemens
 Clifton James as John
 Nancy Nutter as Maureen
 Matthew Anden as Simon
 Jamie Sanchez as Carlos
 Coni Hudak as Kate
 Karen Lynn Gorney as Josette
 Janet Lee Parker as Sandra
 Frank Perry as Newsdealer (uncredited)

This was the film debut of both Janet Margolin and Karen Gorney (who, billed as Karen Lynn Gorney, later became well known for her leading role in Saturday Night Fever in 1977).

Production
In 1961, Ann Perry read the novella and showed it to her mother Eleanor. The playwright was so fascinated by what she read that she set out to write a screenplay, enlisting her husband Frank as director. The resulting film was produced with small investors and a collection of unknowns to keep costs down. Production began in June 1962 in Wynnewood, Pennsylvania. Only after a run on the festival circuit did the film receive a willing exhibitor from New York.

Reception
David and Lisa has received positive reviews from critics. Review aggregator website Rotten Tomatoes reports that 85% of 13 reviews were positive, with an average rating of 6.9/10. Perry estimated (in 1987) the film made roughly $25 million.

Bosley Crowther of The New York Times described the film as "commendable" and "sympathetic," finding the "vague and elusive" explanation of the characters' ills to be "one of the stumbling blocks in this film," but praising Dullea and Margolin, whose portrayal of the protagonists' "growing curiosity and attachment in the midst of a cheerless institute" is "touchingly presented." French director Jean Renoir called it “a turning point in world cinema."

Awards and nominations

The film was nominated for recognition by American Film Institute in these lists:
 2002: AFI's 100 Years...100 Passions – Nominated

Play adaptation
In 1967, the film was adapted into a stage play, but it only ran for a short time.

Plot of the stage play
The play begins with David Clemens and his mother preparing to leave to bring David to "school". We later learn this is a school for children with mental and psychological issues. David's mother is overprotective and overbearing, and it shows. At the station, a porter touches David's arm, and we learn that David is afraid to be touched.

We meet a variety of teachers and other students, particularly Dr. Alan Swinford, the head psychologist, and are introduced to the school. We learn that David has an obsession with clocks, and also with death. We are also introduced to the other title character, Lisa, who has a split personality: one who will only speak in rhymes and the other who will not speak, but will only write or draw her thoughts. Over time, David and Lisa befriend each other, until midway through the play, after an embittering visit, David's parents take him away from the school.

David eventually runs away from his home and comes back to the school, where he is allowed to stay. One day, however, Lisa is annoying David as he listens to another child playing the piano. David becomes cross and shouts at her, and Lisa runs away from the school. David and the head psychologist, Dr. Alan Swinford, go out in search of her, and arrive just in time to save Lisa from the ravages of two boys in a city park. David and Lisa are both relieved that the other is there for them, and somehow Lisa is cured of her two personalities and becomes truly herself, speaking "plain straight" to David for the first time. David extends his hand and asks her to take it, conquering his fear of being touched, and they walk off together, hand in hand.

Television film remake
In 1998, the film was remade into a made-for-television film that premiered on ABC on November 1, 1998. Produced by Oprah Winfrey and directed by Lloyd Kramer, the film starred Lukas Haas as David, Brittany Murphy as Lisa, and Sidney Poitier as Dr. Swinford, with a supporting cast featuring Debi Mazar, Allison Janney, Kim Murphy, Giuseppe Andrews, Vicellous Reon Shannon, Gene Wolande, Kimiko Gelman, and Ty Hodges. The scenes were shifted to the Los Angeles area, including the Museum of Natural History at Exposition Park and Venice Beach.

Awards and nominations

See also
 List of American films of 1962
 Mental illness in film

References

External links
1962 first version
 
 
 
 http://www.goodreads.com/book/show/733723.Jordi_Lisa_and_David

1998 second version
 
 

1962 films
1998 television films
1998 films
1962 drama films
1998 drama films
American drama films
American independent films
Films about dissociative identity disorder
Films based on American novels
Films directed by Frank Perry
Films set in Philadelphia
Films set in psychiatric hospitals
Films set in the 1950s
Films set in the 1960s
David and Lisa (1998 film)
Films shot in Philadelphia
1962 directorial debut films
1990s English-language films
1960s English-language films
1960s American films
1990s American films